Hilário de Gouvêa (1843-1929) was a Brazilian ophthalmologist noted for being the first person to document a case of hereditary cancer.  The cause of the recessive familial retinoblastoma he described was later further investigated and resulted in the first reported example of a tumor suppressor gene, RB.

References 

Brazilian ophthalmologists
1843 births
1929 deaths